Mohammad Mohammad Khan (born 1 May 1911) was an Afghanistan athlete, who competed at the 1936 Summer Olympic Games in the 100 m and Long jump but, failed to reach the next round in either.

References

1911 births
Year of death missing
Olympic athletes of Afghanistan
Athletes (track and field) at the 1936 Summer Olympics
Afghan politicians
Place of birth missing
Afghan male sprinters
Afghan male long jumpers